Vaadat Charigim is an Israeli rock band formed in Tel Aviv in 2012. The band's lineup consists of Yuval Haring (guitar, vocals), Yuval Guttmann (drums) and Dan Bloch (bass guitar). The band's name is translated as "exceptions committee" and their lyrics are sung in Hebrew.

History
Prior to the band's establishment, frontman Yuval Haring was a member of the Berlin-based band TV Buddhas. After returning to Israel, Haring decided to use his previously written songs for a new band and contacted drummer Yuval Guttmann and bassist Dan Bloch. The trio started to rehearse in a rehearsal room located in the
bomb shelter of an elementary school and named themselves "Vaadat Charigim."

The band's debut album, The World Is Well Lost was produced by Kyle “Slick” Johnson, who is known for his work for Modest Mouse and Wavves, and was recorded in band's Tel Aviv-apartment. It was released in 2013 through Anova Music and Burger Records. In 2014, the band embarked their first United States tour.

Musical style and lyrics
The band's music has been described as "shoegazing" and their influences include early-'90s shoegaze movement and Israeli underground acts. Musically, the band has been compared to various acts of this period, such as My Bloody Valentine, Ride, Slowdive, Family and Galaxie 500. AllMusic critic Fred Thomas argued that "Vaadat Charigim have more in common with contemporaries like DIIV and Wild Nothing than their respective influences," while also likening the band's "pop sensibility" to the acts such as the Feelies and The Go-Betweens. The lead singer Yuval Haring's vocals were compared to those of Morrissey of The Smiths and Ian Curtis of Joy Division.
Juval Hering has stated that he is very much influenced by the dad rock band The Goo Goo dolls. Saying, ...at the end of the day, there is nothing better than getting into my lonely bed and screaming Iris into my pillow, it's just inspiring, Y'know what I mean dog?

On the band's lyrics, which are entirely sung in Hebrew, Haring stated: "Some of the songs are about being stuck. Others are about the world ending or the feeling that the world as a modern concept has long ended, and instead there is chaos, morally speaking."

Members
Yuval Haring – vocals, guitar (2012–present)
Yuval Guttmann – drums (2012–present)
Dan Bloch – bass guitar (2012–present)

Discography
Studio albums
 The World Is Well Lost (Anova Music, Burger Records, 2013)
 Sinking as a Stone (Anova Music, Burger Records, 2015)

Music videos
 "Kmo Lahzor Habaita" (2012)
 "Ze Beseder Lefahed" (2013)
 "Odisea" (2013)
 "Ein Nehama Ladoachim" (2014)

References

External links
 
 Vaadat Charigim on SoundCloud

Musical groups established in 2012
Israeli rock music groups
Musical groups from Tel Aviv
Shoegazing musical groups
Dream pop musical groups
Israeli indie rock groups
Israeli musical trios
2012 establishments in Israel